In medicine Sarnat staging, Sarnat Classification or the Sarnat Grading Scale is a classification scale for hypoxic-ischaemic encephalopathy of the newborn (HIE), a syndrome caused by a lack of adequate oxygenation around the time of birth which manifests as altered consciousness, altered muscle tone, and seizures. HIE is graded based on the infant's clinical presentation, examination findings, the presence of seizures and the duration of illness. Sarnat staging is used alongside electroencephalogram findings to provide information about the prognosis for the infant. Mild HIE, according to the scale, usually has a normal outcome, whereas in severe HIE the mortality rate is 75%, and 80% of survivors have neurological sequelae.

UK Resuscitation Council guidelines on newborn life support recommend that a baby who received significant resuscitation at birth and who goes on to show signs of encephalopathy should be assessed by Sarnat Staging between 24 and 48 hours from birth.

Staging

Adapted from

See also
 Cerebral hypoxia
 Hypoxic-ischemic encephalopathy

References

Neonatology
Neurology
Brain disorders
Medical assessment and evaluation instruments